Agios Georgios railway station is a halt near Schimatari, in Boeotia, Greece.  It is owned by OSE, but service are provided by TrainOSE, through the Athens Suburban Railway from Athens to Chalcis.

History
The station opened on 6 April 2005 as an unstaffed intermediate station on the Athens to Chalcis line. That same year TrainOSE was created as a brand within OSE to concentrate on rail services and passenger interface. In 2008, all Athens Suburban Railway services were transferred from OSE to TrainOSE.

Facilities
The station is little more than a halt, with only a small car park; however, there are ramps and thus disabled access.

Services

Since 15 May 2022, the following weekday services call at this station:

Station layout

See also
Railway stations in Greece
Hellenic Railways Organization
Hellenic Train
Proastiakos

References

Transport in Boeotia
Railway stations in Central Greece
Railway stations opened in 2005